Mbagne  is a town and commune in the Brakna Region of southern Mauritania on the border with Senegal. Mbagne has a high unemployment rate and an unstable agriculture system, according to the OECD.

In 2000 it had a population of 10,383.

References

Communes of Brakna Region